Bumper v. North Carolina, 391 U.S. 543 (1968), was a U.S. Supreme Court case in which a search was struck down as illegal because the police falsely claimed they had a search warrant. This was tantamount to telling the subject that she had no choice but to consent. Justice Potter Stewart delivered the decision for the 7-2 majority.

References

External links
 
 

1968 in United States case law
United States Supreme Court cases
United States Supreme Court cases of the Warren Court
United States Fourth Amendment case law